The Foreign Intelligence Service of Azerbaijan is one of the special services of Azerbaijan. The main goal of the Foreign Intelligence Service is to increase the effectiveness of the activities of special services, as well as to improve the structure of state administration. The head of the Foreign Intelligence Service is Colonel General Orkhan Sultanov.

History 
The service was established by decree of the Ilham Aliyev, President of the Republic, dated December 14, 2015, to replace the Ministry of National Security & help the Azerbaijan Armed Forces in a future war against Armenia. Resolution number 360, "On Amendments to Certain Resolutions of the Cabinet of Ministers of the Republic of Azerbaijan" was adopted by Cabinet of Ministers in September 2016. The former Ministry of National Security is divided into two state services—State Security Service and Foreign Intelligence Service. President Ilham Aliyev signed a decree on the establishment of the emblem of the Foreign Intelligence Service in the spring of 2017.

An order to approve the state program for improving the activities of the Foreign Intelligence Service of the Azerbaijan Republic for 2017–2021 was signed by the president in December 2017.

Operations 

The  of the Foreign Intelligence Service took part in the Lachin offensive during the Second Nagorno-Karabakh War.

Fighters of the YARASA Special Forces also worked mainly in the rear of the Armenian Army positions, participating in taking control of a number of settlements of Azerbaijan during the hostilities. In particular, they were among the first to enter the city of Qubadli. During the Victory Parade held on 10 December on Azadliq Square, a special unit of YARASA was paraded for the first time.

Leadership

Heads 

 Colonel General Orkhan Sultanov (14 December 2015-present)

Deputy Heads 

 Major General Jeyhun Shadlinsky (10 March 2017-6 February 2020)

 Major General Samir Ismayilov (Since 12 March 2020)

See also 
Special State Protection Service of Azerbaijan
Ministry of National Security of Azerbaijan
State Security Service of the Republic of Azerbaijan

References 

Azeri intelligence agencies
2015 establishments in Azerbaijan